U Tak (1262-1342), also known as Woo Tak, was a Korean Neo-Confucian scholar and philosopher during Korea’s Goryeo dynasty. He was also commonly known as Yeokdong Seonsaeng. His pen names were Baekun and Danam, his courtesy names were Cheonjang and Takbo, and his posthumous name was Moonhee.  U Tak helped spread Neo-Confucianism, which had come from the Yuan dynasty, in Korea. He was a disciple of the Neo-Confucian scholar, An Hyang. 

U Tak belonged to the Danyang Woo clan. He was the 7th generation descendant of the Danyang Woo clan's founding ancestor, U Hyeon. U had two sons, U Won-gwang and U Won-myeong. U Tak is considered as the ancestor of the Moonheegong branch  of the Danyang Woo clan.

U Tak was a respected scholar and centuries after his death, a Joseon Confucian scholar, Yi Hwang, helped to establish the Yeokdong Seowon in honor of U Tak in 1570.

See also 
 An Hyang
 Danyang Woo clan

References

1262 births
1342 deaths
Korean Confucianists
Neo-Confucian scholars
Danyang U clan
14th-century Korean philosophers